Prussian Chronicle or Teutonic Chronicle can refer to one of the several medieval chronicles:

 Chronicon terrae Prussiae by Peter von Dusburg (written between 1324 and 1326)
 by Nikolaus von Jeroschin, translation of Peter von Dusburg's chronicle written between 1331 and 1335
 Chronica nova Prutenica (New Prussian Chronicle) by Wigand of Marburg (covers the period between 1293 and 1394)
 by Johann von Posilge (written by 1419)
 by Simon Grunau (written between 1510 and 1529)
 by Lucas David (written between 1550 and 1583)